This is a list of schools in Wolverhampton, West Midlands, England.

State-funded schools

Primary schools 

Bantock Primary School, Penn Fields
Berrybrook Primary School, Scotlands
Bilston CE Primary School, Ettingshall
Bushbury Hill Primary School, Bushbury
Bushbury Lane Academy, Oxley
Castlecroft Primary School, Castlecroft
Christ Church CE Infant School, Tettenhall Wood
Christ Church CE Junior School, Tettenhall Wood
Claregate Primary School, Claregate
Corpus Christi RC Primary Academy, Ashmore Park 
D'Eyncourt Primary School, Wood Hayes
Dovecotes Primary School, Dovecotes
Dunstall Hill Primary School, Dunstall Hill
East Park Academy, East Park
Eastfield Primary School, Moseley
Edward the Elder Primary School, Wood End
Elston Hall Primary School, Fordhouses
Fallings Park Primary School, Fallings Park
Field View Primary School, Bunker's Hill
Goldthorn Park Primary School, Goldthorn Park
Graiseley Primary School, Graiseley
Grove Primary Academy, All Saints
Hill Avenue Primary School, Lanesfield
Holy Rosary RC Primary Academy, Monmore Green 
Holy Trinity RC Primary School, The Lunt
Lanesfield Primary School, Lanesfield
Long Knowle Primary School, Wood Hayes
Loxdale Primary School, Parkfields
Manor Primary School, Woodcross
Merridale Primary School, Merridale
Nishkam Primary School, Merridale
Northwood Park Primary School, Bushbury
Oak Meadow Primary School, Ashmore Park
Palmers Cross Primary School, Tettenhall
Parkfield Primary School, Parkfields
Perry Hall Primary School, Ashmore Park
Rakegate Primary School, Oxley
The Royal School, Blakenhall
St Alban's CE Primary Academy, Ashmore Park 
St Andrew's CE Primary School, Whitmore Reans
St Anthony's RC Primary Academy, Fordhouses
St Bartholomew's CE Primary School, Penn
St Jude's CE Primary Academy, Tettenhall
St Luke's CE Primary School, Blakenhall
St Martin's CE Primary School, Bradley
St Mary's RC Primary School, Fallings Park
St Michael's CE Primary School, Tettenhall
St Michael's RC Primary Academy, Merry Hill
St Patrick's RC Primary Academy, Wood End
St Paul's CE Primary School, Pendeford
St Stephen's CE Primary School, Heath Town
St Teresa's RC Primary Academy, Parkfields
St Thomas' CE Primary Academy, Wood End
SS Mary and John's RC Primary Academy, All Saints
SS Peter and Paul RC Primary Academy, Newbridge
Spring Vale Primary School, Parkfields
Springdale Primary School, Penn
Stow Heath Primary School, Stow Heath
Stowlawn Primary School, Stowlawn
Trinity CE Primary Academy, Heath Town
Uplands Junior School, Finchfield
Villiers Primary School, Stow Heath
Warstones Primary School, Warstones
West Park Primary School, Whitmore Reans
Westacre Infant School, Finchfield
Whitgreave Primary School, Low Hill
Wilkinson Primary School, Bradley
Woden Primary School, Heath Town
Wodensfield Primary School, Wood End
Wood End Primary School, Wood End
Woodfield Primary School, Bradmore
Woodthorne Primary School, Tettenhall

Non-selective secondary schools 

Aldersley High School, Pendeford
Colton Hills Community School, Goldthorn Park
Coppice Performing Arts School, Ashmore Park
Heath Park School, Heath Town
Highfields School, Penn
The Khalsa Academy, Ettingshall
The King's Church Of England School, Tettenhall
Moreton School, Bushbury
Moseley Park School, The Lunt
Ormiston NEW Academy, Fordhouses
Ormiston SWB Academy, Parkfields
Our Lady and St Chad Catholic Academy, Fallings Park
The Royal School, Blakenhall
St Edmund's Catholic Academy, Compton
St Matthias School, Deansfield
St Peter's Collegiate Academy, Compton
Smestow Academy, Castlecroft
Thomas Telford University Technical College, Horseley Fields
Wednesfield Academy, Ashmore Park

Grammar schools 
Wolverhampton Girls' High School, Tettenhall

Special and alternative schools

Broadmeadow Special School, Whitmore Reans
The Braybrook Centre, Parkfields
Evergreen Academy, Whitmore Reans
Green Park School, Stowlawn
Midpoint Centre, Parkfields
The Orchard Centre, Parkfields
Penn Fields School, Penn Fields
Penn Hall School, Penn
Pine Green Academy, Whitmore Reans
Tettenhall Wood School, Tettenhall Wood
Westcroft School, Scotlands
Wolverhampton Vocational Training Centre, Ettingshall

Further education
City of Wolverhampton College

Independent schools

Primary and preparatory schools
Newbridge Preparatory School, Newbridge

Senior and all-through schools
Tettenhall College, Tettenhall
Wolverhampton Grammar School, Park Dale

Special and alternative schools
Bow Street School, The Lunt
Progress Schools - Wolverhampton, Wolverhampton City Centre
Woodbury School, Bushbury
WV2 Education, Blakenhall

References 

Wolverhampton City Council website - Secondary schools
Wolverhampton City Council website - Primary schools

Wolverhampton
Schools in Wolverhampton